Serhiy Andriyovych Kryvtsov (born 15 March 1991) is a Ukrainian professional footballer who plays as a defender for Inter Miami in Major League Soccer.

Club career

Metalurh Zaporizhzhia
Born in Zaporizhzhia, Ukraine, Kryvtsov is a product of the Metalurh Zaporizhzhia Youth school system, where he was trained by Viktor Tryhubov. He made his debut for the club at the age of 17 in a 1–1 draw with Chornomorets Odesa on 3 May 2008. His first goal for the club came in a 2–0 victory over Illichivets Mariupol on 27 February 2010. He left the club in May 2012 to join Shakhtar Donetsk for an undisclosed fee.

Shakhtar Donetsk
On 11 May 2010, Kryvtsov, along with Taras Stepanenko, signed for FC Shakhtar Donetsk from Metalurh on a five-year deal. His first appearance for the club came on 10 November 2010 in a 1–0 Ukrainian Cup victory over his old club, Metalurh Zaporizhzhia. He made a further two appearances in his first season, both coming in the league. Shakhtar won the treble with success in the Premier League, Cup and the Super Cup

The following season he made six appearances for the club, five of which came in the league, as Shakhtar clinched the Premier League title and the Ukrainian Cup.

He made his first appearance of the 2012–13 season on 26 August in a 3–0 victory over Karpaty Lviv at the Donbass Arena. He played the full 90 minutes, picking up a yellow card in the 85th minute. He also played in a 3–1 victory over Dynamo Kyiv as a 70th-minute substitute, replacing the injured Oleksandr Kucher who scored twice.

Inter Miami
In January 2023, Kryvtsov joined Major League Soccer club Inter Miami on a two-year deal, with an option for a third-year extension. In his debut game for the club, Kryvtsov netted the opening goal of the match as Inter Miami defeated CF Montréal 2–0. As a result, he was named to the league's Team of the Matchday for week one.

International career
Kryvtsov was a member of the Ukraine U21 and the Ukraine U19 youth teams. He was part of the Ukraine under-19 team that won the 2009 UEFA European Under-19 Championship. He made his first appearance for the senior national side in a 4–0 friendly defeat to Czech Republic on 6 September 2011, playing the full 90 minutes.

Career statistics

Club

International

Honours
Shakhtar Donetsk
 Ukrainian Premier League: 2010–11, 2011–12, 2012–13, 2013–14, 2016–17, 2017–18, 2018–19
 Ukrainian Cup: 2010–11, 2011–12, 2012–13, 2015–16, 2016–17, 2017–18, 2018–19
 Ukrainian Super Cup:  2010, 2012, 2013, 2014, 2015, 2017

Ukraine
UEFA European Under-19 Championship: 2009

References

External links
 
 
 Profile on EUFO
 Profile on Football Squads

1991 births
Living people
Footballers from Zaporizhzhia
Association football defenders
Ukrainian footballers
Ukraine international footballers
Ukraine youth international footballers
Ukraine under-21 international footballers
FC Metalurh Zaporizhzhia players
FC Metalurh-2 Zaporizhzhia players
FC Shakhtar Donetsk players
Inter Miami CF players
Ukrainian Premier League players
Ukrainian Second League players
Major League Soccer players
Ukrainian expatriate footballers
Expatriate soccer players in the United States
Ukrainian expatriate sportspeople in the United States
UEFA Euro 2020 players